Ralph Hurt Barger, Jr. (January 24, 1923 – April 2, 2002) was a printer, lithographer, publisher, and politician.

Born in Oak Park, Illinois, Barger graduated from Glenbard High School. He served in the United States Army Air Forces during World War II as a photographer. Barger was a printer, lithographer, and publisher. He served as Mayor of Wheaton, Illinois from 1971 to 1982 and was involved with the Republican Party. Barger then served in the Illinois House of Representatives from 1983 to 1991. He died from cancer at his home in Wheaton, Illinois.

Notes

External links 

1923 births
2002 deaths
People from Oak Park, Illinois
People from Wheaton, Illinois
United States Army Air Forces soldiers
Military personnel from Illinois
American lithographers
American printers
Mayors of places in Illinois
Republican Party members of the Illinois House of Representatives
Deaths from cancer in Illinois
20th-century American politicians
United States Army Air Forces personnel of World War II
20th-century lithographers